The Royal Military Police Close Protection Unit (RMP CPU) is a unit within the British Army's Royal Military Police (RMP) that has designated responsibility for protecting senior military and government personnel when deployed overseas. The unit itself does not supply the majority of the manpower for such taskings, but trains individuals from the RMP, Royal Navy Police, RAF Police and Royal Marines Police Troop for the role, as well as taking on urgent and short-notice taskings.

History
The CPU was formed in the late 1970s, after a number of RMP bodyguards attended the Special Air Service bodyguard course at Hereford, and brought the skills back to an RMP-specific course, the first of which ran in 1976. Three years later, the course and unit moved to Longmoor Camp where it remains.

Structure
The CPU is a sub-unit within the RMP's Specialist Operations Regiment, commanded by a major. It is considerably smaller than most RMP companies, however, with just a small staff of experienced CP operatives who act as instructors or are held ready to deploy on short-notice tasks.

Role
Close protection operatives trained by CPU protect high-ranking British army officers in high-threat environments, most notably during the Iraq war and Afghanistan war, and ensuring counter-insurgency and peacekeeping operations. They also protect British ambassadors and other high-ranking Foreign and Commonwealth Office officials in locations where the threat level demands it.

Training
The CPU offers a range of training courses. These include the eight-week Close Protection Course that qualifies service police men and women to be CP operatives, a further two-week pre-deployment training course carried out before teams deploy overseas, and specialist driving courses for locally-employed civilian drivers.

Equipment
The CPU trains and deploys with a range of specialist weapons not used by the majority of the British army. These include the Diemaco C8, in the past the Sig Sauer P229, possibly more recently variants of the Glock and the H&K MP5K.

References

Close Protection
Organisations based in Hampshire
Protective security units